East Greenville is a borough in Montgomery County, Pennsylvania. The population was 2,951 at the 2010 census. It is one of a strip of small towns that run together along Route 29, including Red Hill, Pennsburg, and East Greenville. The borough is part of the Upper Perkiomen School District.

History
In 1950, Hans and Florence Knoll moved the headquarters of their company Knoll (known for its modern furniture pieces by architects and designers such as Mies van der Rohe, Eero Saarinen, and Harry Bertoia) to the town, where it remains today. In 2011, the Knoll factory employed about 700 people.

Geography
East Greenville is located at  (40.405626, −75.504144).

Demographics

As of the 2010 census, the borough was 93.7% White, 2.3% Black or African American, 0.1% Native American, 1.0% Asian, and 1.9% were two or more races. 3.3% of the population were of Hispanic or Latino ancestry.

As of the census, of 2000, there were 3,103 people, 1,124 households, and 805 families residing in the borough. The population density was 5,978.9 people per square mile (2,304.0/km2). There were 1,173 housing units at an average density of 2,260.1 per square mile (871.0/km2). The racial makeup of the borough was 96.78% White, 0.90% African American, 0.13% Native American, 0.52% Asian, 0.90% from other races, and 0.77% from two or more races. Hispanic or Latino of any race were 2.64% of the population.

There were 1,124 households, out of which 43.6% had children under the age of 18 living with them, 53.4% were married couples living together, 13.3% had a female householder with no husband present, and 28.3% were non-families. 22.7% of all households were made up of individuals, and 7.4% had someone living alone who was 65 years of age or older. The average household size was 2.76 and the average family size was 3.24.

In the borough, the population was spread out, with 31.4% under the age of 18, 7.6% from 18 to 24, 36.5% from 25 to 44, 16.6% from 45 to 64, and 7.8% who were 65 years of age or older. The median age was 32 years. For every 100 females there were 94.9 males. For every 100 females age 18 and over, there were 90.2 males.

The median income for a household in the borough was $46,875, and the median income for a family was $48,824. Males had a median income of $35,525 versus $29,358 for females. The per capita income for the borough was $19,066. About 3.6% of families and 5.1% of the population were below the poverty line, including 5.8% of those under age 18 and 5.0% of those age 65 or over.

Politics and government

East Greenville has a city manager form of government with a mayor and borough council. The borough is part of the Fourth Congressional District (represented by Rep. Madeleine Dean), Pennsylvania's 131st Representative District (represented by Rep. Milou Mackenzie,) and the 24th State Senate District (represented by Sen. Bob Mensch.)

Education
It is part of the Upper Perkiomen School District. Students in grades nine through 12 attend Upper Perkiomen High School.

Transportation

Pennsylvania Route 29 is the only numbered highway serving East Greenville. It traverses the borough on a north-south alignment along Main Street.

Notable people
 Sabrina Carpenter, singer, songwriter, actress
 Jean Faut, baseball player

References

External links

1851 establishments in Pennsylvania
Boroughs in Montgomery County, Pennsylvania
Boroughs in Pennsylvania
Populated places established in 1851